Lidiya Karamchakova (born February 17, 1968, in Abakan, Russian SFSR) is a retired amateur Russian-Tajikistani freestyle wrestler, who competed in the women's flyweight category. Karamchakova's wrestling career emerged with two career medals at the European Championships (1997 and 2000), before acquiring a dual citizenship to compete for Tajikistan in 2002. Since then, she scored a silver in the 48-kg division at the 2002 Asian Games in Busan, South Korea, and also finished seventh at the 2004 Summer Olympics. Karamchakova is also a member of the Viktor Wrestling Club in Krasnoyarsk, under her personal coach Viktor Raiko.

Karamchakova reached sporting headlines at the 2002 Asian Games in Busan, South Korea, where she picked up a silver medal in the women's flyweight category (48 kg), being pinned by China's Zhong Xiue.

When women's wrestling made its debut at the 2004 Summer Olympics in Athens, Karamchakova qualified for her naturalized Tajik squad in the inaugural 48 kg class. Earlier in the process, she placed third and guaranteed a spot on the Tajik wrestling team from the Olympic Qualification Tournament in Madrid, Spain. Karamchakova lost her opening match to eventual Olympic champion Irini Merleni of Ukraine on technical superiority, but bounced back to upset Greece's Fani Psatha in front of the home audience with a 5–3 verdict, and then pinned Tunisia's Fadhila Louati before reaching the two-minute mark. Despite missing a spot for the semifinals, Karamchakova had a chance to compete against Russia's Lorisa Oorzhak, but she fell behind her fellow Russian rival by a rare 11–0 defeat, placing seventh in the final standings.

References

External links
 

1968 births
Living people
Russian female sport wrestlers
Tajikistani female sport wrestlers
Olympic wrestlers of Tajikistan
Wrestlers at the 2004 Summer Olympics
Wrestlers at the 2002 Asian Games
Asian Games medalists in wrestling
People from Abakan
Tajikistani people of Russian descent
Asian Games silver medalists for Tajikistan
Medalists at the 2002 Asian Games
European Wrestling Championships medalists
Sportspeople from Khakassia